Haplochromis serranus is a species of cichlid endemic to Lake Victoria.  This species reaches a length of  SL.

References

serranus
Fish of Lake Victoria
Fish described in 1896
Taxa named by Georg Johann Pfeffer
Taxonomy articles created by Polbot